Rick Castro (July 20, 1958) is an American photographer, motion picture director, stylist, curator and blogger whose work focuses on bondage and sado-masochistic sex.

Early life
Castro began work as a fashion stylist and clothing designer. Over the years, he worked for as a stylist on fashion shoots or designed clothing for Marlene Stewart, Bette Midler, David Bowie, Herb Ritts, the style agency Cloutier, George Hurrell,  Interview magazine, GQ magazine, Vanity Fair magazine, Rolling Stone magazine, I-D magazine, Tina Turner and John Leguizamo. Castro was the designer for Michele Lamy's first menswear collection- Lamy Men, (1986-1989).

Photographic career
In 1986, photographer Joel-Peter Witkin took him to purchase his first camera in Albuquerque, NM. In 1988, at the age of 30, Castro became a freelance photographer, and his work appeared in the Los Angeles gay news magazines Frontiers,Drummer and the national gay news magazine, The Advocate.

His first solo exhibition, "Nothing But A Man, Everything But A Woman", debuted in 1989 at A Different Light Bookstore in Silver Lake, a suburb of Los Angeles. It was followed a year later by "Mass Murder & A Cute Boy" at the same location.

Throughout the years, Castro has had a number of exhibitions, including "Furotica: It Ain't Exactly Bambi" at the Track 16 gallery in Los Angeles, 2003.

Castro's work is collected by the Kinsey Institute for Research in Sex, Gender and Reproduction, ONE Archives: National Gay & Lesbian Archives at the USC Libraries, Leslie-Lohman Museum of Gay and Lesbian Art, and the Tom of Finland Foundation.

His 1994 short film of hustler interviews inspired Bruce LaBruce to film Hustler White with Tony Ward. Castro collaborated on the film as writer and co-director with LaBruce, which became an international sensation. In 1998, he appeared in Sex/Life in L.A. Jochen Hick's adult documentary about the sex lives of the guys who make L.A. adult movies. Castro has directed a number of other short films and a documentary.

Rick Castro has lived in Los Angeles his entire life. He was the West coast correspondent for the Australia-based Studio Magazines, publisher of the nude male art photography magazine Blue 2001 thru 2007.

Rick's first gallery opened at Les Duex Cafes, Hollywood, in 2002, and premiered the first Furry themed art show. Castro then founded and ran Antebellum Gallery, the only fetish art gallery in America, and perhaps the world- November 11, 2005 thru January 1, 2017.

Castro shot the F/W lookbook 2014 for designer Rick Owens using his 93-year-old father Al Castro as the featured model.

During October, 2015, Rick Castro received an artist lifetime Achievement award from the Tom of Finland foundation. Castro's photography was featured in Rick Owens: Subhuman, Inhuman, Superhuman at Triennale di Milano, December 2017- March 2018. Castro was interviewed by his former boyfriend, designer Rick Owens for the May 2019 issue of Autre Magazine, and featured in the historic first queer issue of Los Angeles Magazine, June 2019. Castro has received a grant from Department of Cultural Affairs, Los Angeles for a virtual project entitled Reimagine Home~ 2020. Castro is contributing photographer and writer for AnOther  and Anotherman Magazines UK.

Critical assessment

Castro works predominately in black-and-white photography.

Castro himself says his work is highly time-bound, linked to the 1980s and early 1990s:

My documentation is a time capsule of that period. The early 80s started off with the leftover freedoms and hedonism of the 70s, then plunged into the darkness and fear that accompanied AIDS. Sex was once again demonized, as it had previously been in the Victorian era and the 50s. ... As fear of sex and the religious right gained even more power, the undercover police constantly patrolled the streets. At the same time drugs (crack, 'Tina') became harsher as the unstable economy created desperation on the street. Then the Internet came along with a network of online brothels and eventually wiped out the street scene entirely.

In many ways, Castro can almost be said to be a historical photographer, recreating images and looks from that time period rather than capturing contemporary styles. "Nostalgia" is not a word one usually associates with BDSM photography, but in Castro's case it may be an apt adjective.

Castro's photography also stands in the quasi-religious tradition of most BDSM photography. The art historian and critic Edward Lucie-Smith has pointed out that Castro's work is deeply rooted in religious art, especially Catholic art of the Baroque period. The believer, suffering for his beliefs, is mimicked by the gay man, suffering for his homosexuality. The ecstasy of martyrdom is mimicked by the ecstasy of sex. These themes were explored by the Christian Baroque painters, and Castro's bondage photography—like most bondage photography—draws heavily on these paintings for its poses.

But Castro's photography is not run-of-the-mill BDSM imagery. Writer Mark Christopher Harvey notes that Castro's photography "can be viewed as a long form of meditation—not only on the aesthetic virtues of bondage but also on the psyche of sex itself..." Harvey points to the "wry humor" that is often missing in more commercially inspired or less artistic BDSM photographs.

In including humor in his work, Castro confounds the Baroque—which focuses on simple, strong, dramatic expression—in favor of Mannerism, and he avoids the self-conscious, overcharged, unnaturally detailed, jarring elements of Mannerism.

Castro's work moves beyond artistic characteristics to capture the sexual fetishism of BDSM as well. The transgressive nature of leather fetishism—hearkening back to 'bad-boy' film images made popular by James Dean and Marlon Brando—intersects with the transgressive nature of homosexual sex and promiscuity in the era of AIDS. Castro's images have power because they are those of the true fetishist. These are not images produced by 'just any' photographer who can hire a handsome model and buy a leather harness off the rack at a local sex shop. Castro's images reflect the imagination and variety of BDSM and leather fetishists; they create and lead, rather than follow, popular culture and sexual fashion.

Published books
 
 
 

He has also self-published the following hand-made books:
 Zack 1991
 The Bondage Book #1. 1992.
 The Bondage Book #2. 1993
 The Bondage Book #3. 1994
 The Bondage Book #4. 1996

Filmed works
1992: Automolove
1993:   Fertile Latoyah Jackson Video Magazine #1
1994: 45 Minutes of Bondage
1994:   Fertile Latoyah Jackson Video Magazine#2 The Kinky Issue
1994:   Three Faces of Women
1996: Hustler White
1997: Another 45 Minutes of Bondage
2001: Plushies and Furries
2013    ANTEBELLUM2013
2014:   ANTEBELLUM2014
2015:   ANTEBELLUM2015
2016:   ANTEBELLUM2016
2017:   The Dark Waters of Hotel Cecil

External links 

 Blog of Antebellum Gallery

References

1958 births
Living people
American gay artists
American LGBT photographers
20th-century American photographers
21st-century American photographers